Patna is an unincorporated community in Highland County, Virginia, United States. The community is situated along the Cowpasture River in the southern section of the Cowpasture Valley of Highland County.

References

Unincorporated communities in Highland County, Virginia
Unincorporated communities in Virginia